The Howard H. Baker Jr. Center for Public Policy is a nonpartisan institute on the campus of the University of Tennessee devoted to education and research concerning public policy and civic engagement. Through classes, public lectures, research, and student initiatives, the center aims to provide policy makers, citizens, scholars, and students with the information and skills necessary to work effectively within our political system and to serve our local, state, national, and global communities.

By examining policy and politics through a nonpartisan lens, the Baker Center continues the groundbreaking work of its namesake, Senator Howard H. Baker Jr., who was nicknamed “The Great Conciliator” for his ability to cross party lines and encourage lawmakers to cooperate on key issues affecting the public good. In the spirit of Baker's work, the center offers a number of public lectures and programs on topics across the political spectrum, with a focus on its three main areas: Energy & Environment, Global Security and Leadership & Governance.

To help promote policy-related scholarship, the Baker Center also is home to the Modern Political Archive featuring the papers of many Tennessee political leaders, including those of Senator Baker himself, Senator Fred Thompson, Ambassador Victor Ashe, and Governor Donald Sundquist.

Mission statement
"The Baker Center develops programs and promotes research to further the public's knowledge of our system of governance and of critical public policy issues, and to highlight the importance of public service.  Areas of special interest include the media, energy, environment, the teaching of civics and history, political communications, national security, and the future of representative government.  The Baker Center is and will remain a non-partisan institution.  In all of our programs and activities, we seek to include and discuss many perspectives.  In the best tradition of Howard Baker, the Center embodies his genuine respect for differing points of view.  The Center neither advocates nor endorses specific policies or individuals.  Instead, we serve as a forum for discussion, debate, education, and unbiased research."

History
In 2001, the University of Tennessee received a congressionally authorized Fund for the Improvement of Postsecondary Education (FIPSE) grant to create the center and begin its programming and operations. In January 2003, Alan Lowe began serving as executive director. The center sought out to follow Howard Baker Jr.'s bipartisan line of reasoning in all of their research and programming.

The Baker Center was originally located in Hoskins Library, but moved to the newly constructed Howard H. Baker Jr. Center for Public Policy in 2008. The new facility is located on the corner of Melrose and Cumberland, and officially opened to the public on October 31, 2008. It has more than 52,000 square feet of space that includes an auditorium and rotunda for public events, classrooms, state-of-the-art archives storage and research areas, an interactive museum, a boardroom, an office for Senator Baker, and the administrative spaces necessary for the Baker Center's operations. The museum was later removed and now houses the Chancellor Honors Program offices. As a part of the dedication ceremony, The Honorable Sandra Day O'Connor spoke along with Howard Baker Jr., and other notable Tennesseans.

Dr. Matt Murray is the active director.

Senator Howard H. Baker Jr.
Howard H. Baker Jr. was the first popularly elected Republican senator from Tennessee.

First elected in 1967, Senator Baker's penchant for bipartisanship resulted in his ascent to Senate leadership, first as minority then as majority leader of the US Senate. After retiring from public office, Senator Baker returned to government to serve as White House chief of staff to President Ronald Reagan in 1987. In 2001, President George W. Bush appointed Senator Baker ambassador to Japan.

Senator Baker rose above party lines to craft solutions to some of the nation's most pressing issues. The Howard H. Baker Jr. Center for Public Policy was established in 2003 to honor the Senator's distinguished career through the promotion of civic involvement in politics, public policy research, and student engagement.

Focus programs

Throughout the year, the Baker Center hosts lectures, conferences, roundtable discussions, classes, and other events that address the key issues of today's world. These programs bring together scholars, lawmakers, community members, and students to discuss how to potentially resolve such pressing problems as education shortfalls, global disease epidemics, and armed conflict. Although its programming is wide in scope, the Baker Center is especially focused on four topics: governance studies, energy and environment, and global security. Each of these topics was chosen for its political, social, and cultural importance, and so the center brings experts and members of the UT community together to address them in open and unbiased discussion aimed at the formulation of effective and workable policy responses.

Leadership and Governance Studies Program
A former congressional and White House correspondent for The New York Times observed that throughout Senator Baker's public career, the senator “reflected certain values—bipartisanship, a respect for the Congress as an institution, a sense of civility, and a belief in the value of compromise—values that are far less visible today in Washington than when he was there.” Those values are at the heart of the Baker Studies Program's mission, which is essentially twofold. First, the Baker Studies Program encourages and facilitates the maximum use of the Modern Political Archives housed at the Baker Center. These archives, which include the papers of Senator Baker and many of Tennessee's most accomplished modern political leaders and jurists, are a significant and substantial resource for scholars, journalists, students, and others interested in regional and national history. For instance, the archives’ Oral History Program includes the transcripts of some 300 interviews of Senator Baker and numerous of his associates. Second, the Baker Studies Program provides a unique forum for exploring the values that Senator Baker epitomized in his career in public service. Hopefully, public policy decision makers will be inspired by that career and will espouse those values that were Senator Baker's hallmark. Toward that end, the Baker Studies Program is sponsoring academic conferences on topics ranging from Senator Baker's role in the Senate Watergate Committee's investigation to the service rendered by Senator Baker as Senate minority and majority leader, President Richard Nixon's overtures to Senator Baker as a possible successor to U.S. Supreme Court Justice John Marshall Harlan II, and Senator Baker's tenure as White House Chief of Staff to President Ronald Reagan.

Energy and Environment Program
The Energy and Environment Program at the Baker Center strives to continue Senator Baker's work in the areas of energy and environmental policy. The program examines how energy and environmental issues affect the quality of life for people around the world. Among the issues addressed by the program are energy consumption and conservation; nuclear energy; renewable energy; air and water pollution; and climate change. The center hopes to study the interaction of energy and the environment to develop economically sound policies that improve the quality of life of the world's citizens. The center's activities in energy and environmental policy programs have been strengthened by the establishment of key partnerships with other energy policy institutes, think tanks, professional societies, universities, national laboratories, and industries.

Global Security Program
The center's Global Security Program examines the shifting landscapes of science, technology, and policy, and how these and other factors can affect the political and cultural environment both at home and abroad. Identifying threats to national security—particularly nuclear terrorism—will be important in implementing policies that protect citizens from internal and external attack. The goal of the program is to bring together industry leaders, technology and policy experts, and government officials in order to devise policies on key issues of national security.

Student programs

Baker Center Living Learning Community

A living-learning experience for incoming college freshmen, the Baker Center Learning Community seeks to promote citizenship while offering shared opportunities to increase understanding of our system of governance within an established student support network.

Students accepted to the learning community live together in Morrill Hall and take honors courses together in the fall and the spring. Courses incorporate simulation and service-learning activities that allow students opportunities to examine public policies and experience how those policies affect the real world. In addition, learning community members often engage in roundtable discussions joined by a variety of community leaders and university faculty.

Opportunities for leadership within the learning community exist for members as well. Not all facets of communal living are school related, and members are often asked to take a significant role in planning Baker Center events, such as debate watches or guest lectures. Members are also encouraged to lead roundtable discussions and assist in planning social outings for the group. In fact, many members continue to be involved after their freshman year and can serve as resources to new members with great ideas.

Baker Ambassadors

As an ambassador, students will be given the opportunity to bridge the gap between their student life and their involvement in the Baker Center and the wider community. This opportunity will be open to all UT students who are interested in public policy, politics, government, and public service.

Conference and Special Event Hosts: Students will work before, during and after the event takes place to help with planning and make sure the event functions properly.

National Campaign for Civic & Political Engagement: UT is a member of this Harvard-led consortium, which focuses on political engagement, from research and promotion of voting, to educational programs for younger students.

Educational and Social Events for Baker Scholars and Learning Community: Help plan educational and social events for the Baker Center Living and Learning Community and Baker Scholars.

Baker Scholars
Tennessee's most academically gifted, politically curious students by offering a unique and meaningful opportunity to engage in public policy and research. Baker Scholars are not only given exclusive access to guest lecturers ranging from international ambassadors to Supreme Court justices, they often drive Baker Center programming and assist with conferences featuring top-ranked experts in the fields of political science, energy and environment, global security, historical/archival studies, and the media.

The central undertaking of each Baker Scholar is research. Each scholar may choose to address a public policy issue of their choice, propose a research topic of personal interest, and/or utilize the Modern Political Archives through a year-long research project.

In addition to research, scholars are strongly encouraged to participate in Baker Center events. Guest lectures and conferences offered at the center give scholars the chance to expand their networks of professional contacts and hear first-hand accounts from political insiders.

Applications are accepted in August of each year. Students can be a Junior or Senior and should have a minimum GPA of 3.35 and at least one academic year at UT remaining in order to complete a research project.

Modern Political Archives
The Baker Center for Public Policy houses the Modern Political Library & Archives (MPA), run by the University of Tennessee Libraries' Special Collections. The MPA contains over 4,000 linear feet of archival material (manuscripts, books, photographs, film, sound recordings, digital files, and ephemera) representing the careers and legacies of select Tennessean members of the U.S. Congress, the federal judiciary, and presidential cabinets. Collections open for research include the papers of Senators Howard H. Baker Jr., William Emerson Brock III, Estes Kefauver, Fred Dalton Thompson, Howard Baker Sr., and Congresswoman Irene Baker.

Public programs
The Baker Center hosts a wide range of public programs that involve and inform local, regional, national, and international audiences.  The topics for these events involve issues important to America today, as informed by an understanding of history.  The Center ensures that its public programs include a variety of students' issues and perspectives.  The Baker Center has brought speakers including Al Gore, Fred Thompson, Bob Woodward, Winston Churchill III, and presented hundreds of other community and policy related events.

Since fall 2012, the Baker Center has hosted a bi-annual Baker Distinguished Lecture Series event. Senator George Mitchell spoke at the inaugural event and Secretary of Education Arne Duncan spoke in Spring 2013.

Future
On November 15, 2005, Senator Baker's 80th birthday, the Baker Center broke ground for its new facility—a  building on the corner of Cumberland Avenue and Melrose Place in Knoxville. This new building has educational, exhibit, public program, collection storage, research, and other administrative spaces critical to its operations. The center opened on October 31, 2008. Prominent speakers such as Sandra Day O'Connor helped with the opening.

The Baker Center now also houses the University of Tennessee's Chancellors Honors Program.

References

External links
Howard H. Baker Jr. Center for Public Policy
Modern Political Archives

University of Tennessee campus
2003 establishments in Tennessee